The Empire of China was a short-lived attempt by statesman, general and president Yuan Shikai from late 1915 to early 1916 to reinstate monarchy in China, with himself as the Hongxian Emperor. The attempt was unsuccessful; it set back the Chinese republican cause by many years and fractured China into a period of conflict between various local warlords.

Preparations for formation 

After Yuan Shikai was installed as the second Provisional Great President of the Republic of China established by Sun Yat-sen, he took various steps to consolidate his power and remove opposition leaders from office. Both Sun and Yuan were "modernizers", Sun was a "radical revolutionary", while Yuan was a "conservative reformer".

To secure his own power he collaborated with various European powers as well as Japan. Around August 1915, he instructed Yang Du et al. to canvass support for a return of the monarchy. On 11 December 1915, an assembly unanimously elected him as Emperor. Yuan ceremonially declined, but "relented" and immediately agreed when the National Assembly petitioned again that day.

On 12 December, Yuan, supported by his son Yuan Keding, declared the Empire of China with himself as the "Great Emperor of the Chinese Empire", taking the era name Hongxian ("Promote the Constitution"). However, Yuan, now known as the Hongxian Emperor, delayed the accession rites until 1 January 1916. He had Manchu clothes removed from culture and had Han clothes revived but had put some changes to it. He wore new Han clothes to attend a dress rehearsal, but it was sabotaged by his Korean concubine.

Soon after, the Hongxian Emperor started handing out titles of peerage to his closest relatives and friends, as well as those whom he thought he could buy with titles.

The Aisin Gioro family of the Qing dynasty, then living in the Forbidden City, "approved" of Yuan's accession as emperor, and even proposed a "royal marriage" of Yuan's daughter to Puyi, the last Qing monarch.

Backlash 

The year 1916 was to be "Hongxian Year 1" rather than "Republic Year 5", but the Hongxian Emperor was opposed by not only the revolutionaries, but far more importantly by his subordinate military commanders, who believed that Yuan's assumption of the monarchy would allow him to rule without depending on the support of the military.

Province after province rebelled after his inauguration, starting with Yunnan, led by the emperor's governor Cai E and general Tang Jiyao and Jiangxi, led by governor Li Liejun. The revolters formed the National Protection Army and thus began the National Protection War. This was followed by other provinces declaring independence from the Empire. The emperor's Beiyang generals, whose soldiers had not received pay once from the imperial government, did not put up an aggressive campaign against the National Protection Army and the Beiyang Army suffered numerous defeats despite being better trained and equipped than the National Protection Army.

Seeing the Hongxian Emperor's weakness and unpopularity, foreign powers withdrew their support (but did not choose sides in the war). The Empire of Japan first threatened to invade, then committed to overthrowing the Hongxian Emperor and recognised both sides of the conflict to be "in a state of war" and allowed Japanese citizens to help the Republicans. Faced with universal opposition, the emperor repeatedly delayed the accession rites to appease his foes. Funding for the ceremony was cut on 1 March. Yuan deliberated abandoning the monarchy with Liang Shiyi on 17 March and abandoned it on 22 March. The "Hongxian" year was abolished on 23 March and the Republic was restored. Yuan reigned a total of 83 days.

After President Yuan's death on 6 June, Vice President Li Yuanhong assumed the presidency, and appointed Beiyang general Duan Qirui as his Premier and restored the National Assembly and the provisional Constitution. However, the central authority of the Beijing government was significantly weakened and the demise of Yuan's Empire plunged China into a period of warlordism.

National symbols
Although the name of the country in Chinese was changed to the "Empire of China" (and "Hongxian" for state matters), the Hongxian Emperor continued to use "Republic of China" as the English name.

The Hongxian Emperor set up the Ritual Regulations Office, which issued the new official anthem for the Republic of China, "China heroically stands in the Universe" in June 1915. Its lyrics were written by Yin Chang and music by Wang Lu.

Yao was a legendary Chinese ruler. The era of Yao and Shun is a Four-character idiom which means times of peace and prosperity.

The national flag was changed from the original five-stripe flag to one where the red stripe is a centered cross; however, a flag with the former red stripe as a saltire was the version commonly used.

The national emblem remained as the national emblem of the Republic of China (1913–1928), National emblem of Twelve Symbols of Sovereignty.

List of people given peerages by the Hongxian Emperor

Crown Prince 
Yuntai

Prince of the First Rank Wuyi
Duke Yansheng Kong Lingyi
Li Yuanhong

Dukes of the First Rank
Duan Zhigui
Feng Guozhang
Jiang Guiti
Liu Guanxiong
Long Jiguang
Ni Sichong
Zhang Xun

Marquesses of the First Rank
Chen Yi
Li Chun
Lu Rongting
Tang Jiyao
Tang Xiangming
Wang Zhanyuan
Yan Xishan
Zhao Ti
Zhu Rui

Counts of the First Rank
Cao Kun
Jin Yunpeng
Lu Jianzhang
Meng Enyuan
Qi Yaolin
Qu Yinguang
Tian Wenlie
Yang Shande
Yang Zengxin
Zhang Mingqi
Zhang Xiluan
Zhu Jiabao

Viscounts of the First Rank
Li Houji
Liu Xianshi
Zhang Guangjian
Zhu Qinglan

Barons of the First Rank
Cai Rukai
Chen Bingkun
Duan Shuyun
He Zonglian
Jin Yong
Long Jianzhang
Long Jinguang
Lu Yongxiang
Lü Diaoyuan
Ma Anliang
Pan Juying
Qi Yang
Ren Kecheng
Shen Jinjian
Wang Yitang
Xu Shiying
Zhang Huaizhi

Baron of the Third Rank
 Feng Yuxiang
 He Fenglin
 Xu Lanzhou

See also 

 Warlord era
 History of the Republic of China
 Self-proclaimed monarchy
 Military of the Republic of China
 National Protection War

References

External links 
 

 
Warlord Era
1915 establishments in China
States and territories disestablished in 1916
China
China (1915-1916)
China (1915-1916)
1916 in China
Former countries in Chinese history
China
Conservatism in China